XHMAR-FM 98.5/XEMAR-AM 710 is a combo radio station in Acapulco, Guerrero. It is owned by Radio Paraíso, S.A. de C.V., a subsidiary of Grupo ACIR.

History
XEMAR received its first concession on February 25, 1959 as XEKU. It was owned by Radio Paraíso, S.A. Sometime in the 1970s or 1980s, XEKU became XEMAR. In 1994, XEMAR became an AM/FM combo.

Until 2014, XHMAR carried the Amor format. It moved to XHAGS-FM 103.1. Its Digital pop format became Radio Disney and moved to 98.5.

Match
On December 26, 2019, Disney and ACIR announced they were mutually ending their relationship, which had covered twelve Mexican cities. Ten of the twelve Radio Disney stations were transitioned to ACIR's replacement pop format, Match, but not XHOK-FM Monterrey or XHMAR, which adopted a temporary "98.5 FM" brand.

Amor moved back from XHAGS-FM to XHMAR on August 4, 2020, after ACIR ceased airing its own formats on stations owned by the Guilbot family in Acapulco and Villahermosa.

References

Radio stations in Guerrero
Radio stations established in 1959
Grupo ACIR